{{Taxobox
| name = 
| image = 
| image_caption = 
| regnum = Animalia
| phylum = Mollusca
| classis = Gastropoda
| unranked_superfamilia = clade Heterobranchia
clade Euthyneura
clade Nudipleura
clade Nudibranchia
clade Euctenidiacea
clade Doridacea
| superfamilia = Onchidoridoidea
| familia = Goniodorididae
| genus = Okenia
| species = O. africana
| binomial = Okenia africana| binomial_authority = Edmunds, 2009
}}Okenia africana'' is a species of sea slug, specifically a dorid nudibranch, a marine gastropod mollusc in the family Goniodorididae.

Distribution
This species was described from Ghana.

References

Endemic fauna of Ghana
Goniodorididae
Gastropods described in 2009